Ryuji Utomo Prabowo (born 1 July 1995) is an Indonesian professional footballer who plays for Liga 1 club Bali United and the Indonesia national team. He plays mainly at centre-back but can also operate as a defensive midfielder.

Club career

Al Najma
After training at youth clubs in Indonesia, Ryuji made his professional debut in Bahrain with Manama club Al-Najma in a 20 August 2015 friendly match against Malkiya Club. In this match, Ryuji was a starter who played 60 minutes before he was replaced. During this match, he received a yellow card in the fifth minute after a foul in the penalty area.

Ryuji on 19 December 2015 scored his first goal for Al Najma in an away match against Al Tadamun Buri.

Arema FC
After six months in Bahrain, Ryuji returned to Indonesia to join Arema ahead of the unauthorized 2016 Indonesia Soccer Championship (ISC). As an apprentice to Arema's more senior players, Ryuji began to build his reputation as a physically robust defender who caught the attention of richer clubs at the end of the ISC. During a pre-season tournament ahead of the launching of the new Liga 1 (Indonesia) top-flight competition, Ryuji left Arema after failing to win a starting position.

Persija Jakarta
Rich club Persija Jakarta saw Ryuji's Arema departure as a chance to develop the young defender's potential. On 3 February 2017, Ryuji accepted an offer to join his hometown club. Another reason was Ryuji wanted to play close to his Jakarta-based ailing father. Ryuji played in nine matches for Persija in the 2017 Liga 1 season, impressing coach Stefano Cugurra who used him when senior players were on international duty.

Despite its intention to keep Ryuji for the 2018 season, Persija let Ryuji play in Thailand on loan for a year. This spell increased Ryuji's value, leading to a renewed contract in 2019 to guarantee his services. However, Ryuji went overseas again on loan from December 2020 as a byproduct of the COVID-19 pandemic that stopped the 2020 Liga 1 season. Without certainty on when professional football in Indonesia could resume, Ryuji chose to take an offer to play for the newly promoted Malaysia Super League club Penang for one full season.

PTT Rayong (loan)
On 4 December 2017, Ryuji joined Thai League 2 club PTT Rayong on a one-year contract. His agent said one of the reasons that made Ryuji take the offer was the pay could help him finance his ailing father's medical treatment, indicating that Persija did not pay him as satisfactory. At Rayong, Ryuji developed into a more versatile player as coach Teerasak Po-on often played the center back as a defensive midfielder. Ryuji played in 18 matches for Rayong and helped the club win the 2018 Thai League 2 season, earning it a promotion into Thai League 1.

Penang FC (loan)
Ryuji in December 2020 signed for Penang to play in the 2021 Malaysia Super League season, on loan from Persija Jakarta. On 6 March 2021, Ryuji made his debut for Penang on a league game against Kuala Lumpur City, playing full 90-minutes as his team won 1-0.

Bali United
On 13 January 2023, Ryuji signed a contract with Liga 1 club Bali United from Persija Jakarta. Ryuji made his league debut for the club in a 2–2 draw against PSM Makassar, coming on as a substituted Ilija Spasojević.

International career 
Ryuji has always played for Indonesia on the international level despite eligibility to play for Japan, where his mother comes from. Ryuji was part of the Indonesia national under-23 football team that won bronze in the 2017 Southeast Asian Games. After playing 13 times for the Indonesian national youth teams, Ryuji made his international debut for the senior team on 21 March 2017, against Myanmar.

Career statistics

Club

International

Personal life 
Ryuji was born to an Indonesian father and a Japanese mother. His father, who died on 1 September 2020, motivated him to pursue his football dreams. Several of Ryuji's career decisions were shaped by his father's health conditions.

Ryuji is married to sports television presenter Shabrina Ayu, making them be seen as a celebrity couple in Indonesia. Their 16 March 2019 wedding pictures splashed the front pages of Indonesian entertainment tabloids. Ryuji became a father on 13 February 2020.

Honours

Club
PTT Rayong
 Thai League 2: 2018

International
Indonesia U-23
 Southeast Asian Games  Bronze medal: 2017
Indonesia
 AFF Championship runner-up: 2020

References

External links
 
 

1995 births
Living people
Indonesian footballers
People from Jakarta
Indonesian people of Japanese descent
Sportspeople from Jakarta
Association football central defenders
Javanese people
Indonesia youth international footballers
Indonesia international footballers
Mitra Kukar players
Al-Najma SC (Bahrain) players
Arema F.C. players
Persija Jakarta players
Ryuji Utomo
Penang F.C. players
Bali United F.C. players
Liga 1 (Indonesia) players
Ryuji Utomo
Malaysia Super League players
Indonesian expatriate footballers
Expatriate footballers in Bahrain
Expatriate footballers in Thailand
Indonesian expatriate sportspeople in Thailand
Expatriate footballers in Malaysia
Indonesian expatriate sportspeople in Malaysia
Southeast Asian Games bronze medalists for Indonesia
Southeast Asian Games medalists in football
Competitors at the 2017 Southeast Asian Games